Ralph T. Holman (March 4, 1918 – August 15, 2012) was a biochemist whose research focused on lipids and fatty acids, especially the Omega-3 fatty acid. He is regarded as the "Father of Omega-3 fatty acids", coining the term in 1963.

A review of the work of Dr. Holman is available in  the Journal of Nutrition as written by himself: 
Holman RT. The slow discovery of the importance of omega-3 essential fatty acids in human health.  J Nutr 1998;128:427S-433S.

Early life and education 
Ralph Theodore Holman was born and raised in Minneapolis, Minnesota. Holman graduated from Bethel Junior College in 1937. He received a BS in biochemistry from the University of Minnesota, and an MS in biochemistry from Rutgers University. He earned a PhD in physiological chemistry from the University of Minnesota, and finished two post-doctoral fellowships in Sweden.

Teaching 
He was a teacher at Texas A&M, the University of Minnesota, and at the Mayo Medical School.

Awards and recognition 
He became a member of the National Academy of Sciences for his work on lipids and fatty acids. In 1998 he was recognized as a Distinguished Alumnus of the Year at Bethel Junior College.

Accomplishments

 Associate of Arts, Bethel College, 1937
 Bachelor of Science in Biochemistry, University of Minnesota
 Master of Science in Biochemistry, Rutgers University
 Ph.D. in Physiological Chemistry
 Member of National Academy of Sciences, 1981
 Emeritus Professor of Biochemistry, University of Minnesota
 Adjunct Professor of Biochemistry, the Mayo Medical School
 President, American Oil Chemists Society, 1974–1975
 Associate Editor and Editor, Lipids
 Executive Director, University of Minnesota's Hormel Institute
 Established the Ralph T. and Karla C. Holman Endowed Program in Chemistry at Bethel College, 1991
 A. Richard Baldwin Distinguished Service Award, 2001
 American Oil Chemists Society, Health & Nutrition Division, Lifetime Achievement Award, 2004

References

American biochemists
Members of the United States National Academy of Sciences
University of Minnesota College of Biological Sciences alumni
Rutgers University alumni
1918 births
2012 deaths
Bethel University (Minnesota) alumni